Thomas L. Spray was Chief of the Division of Cardiothoracic Surgery and the Mortimer J. Buckley, Jr. MD Endowed Chair in Cardiac Surgery at the Children's Hospital of Philadelphia and Professor of Surgery at the Perelman School of Medicine at the University of Pennsylvania. He retired in 2018.

Early life
Spray was born in Rochester, MN on August 28, 1948. The family moved to Oak Ridge, TN, where he completed high school. He was inspired by his father's orthopedic surgery practice to follow a career in medicine, being particularly impressed by his experiences accompanying his father on a medical mission trip to Algeria. He attended college at Haverford College majoring in Molecular Biology, receiving departmental honors.

Career
After medical school at Duke University, he was a resident in general surgery at Duke University Medical Center. As part of his residency, he took two years for specialty training in cardiac pathology at the NHLBI. After completing training in cardiac surgery at Duke University Medical Center, he was appointed an assistant professor at Washington University School of Medicine, where he rose to a full professorship. In 1994, he was recruited to the Children's Hospital of Philadelphia as chief of the Division of Cardiothoracic Surgery, where he served until 2018.

In 2009, Spray was elected the 89th president of the American Association for Thoracic Surgery.

Accomplishments
Spray was one of the early adopters of ECMO. He was among the first to use intraoperative echocardiography to guide repair of congenital heart disease. He has become an expert and advocate for the Ross procedure.  He has performed over 10,000 operations in his over 20-year career.

Awards
William W.L Glenn Lecture, American Heart Association, 2009
Plus ratio quam vis medal from the Jagiellonian University, 2017

Appearances in popular media
 Features in Dateline NBC "Saving a Broken Heart" about an infant with hypoplastic left heart syndrome undergoing the Norwood procedure

References

Living people
1948 births
American cardiac surgeons
Haverford College alumni
Duke University School of Medicine alumni
Perelman School of Medicine at the University of Pennsylvania faculty